is a 1960 Japanese drama film directed by Kon Ichikawa. The film is based on the novel Otōto by Aya Koda. It was entered into the 1961 Cannes Film Festival, where it won a prize for Special Distinction.

Plot
17-year-old Gen takes care of the household of her family due to her stepmother's rheumatism. Meanwhile, her younger brother Hekiro lives a carefree life, repeatedly getting into trouble and making gambling debts. Neither his stepmother interferes with his behaviour, nor does the detached father, a famous novelist. Only Gen scolds Hekiro from time to time, for which he ridicules her, although she is completely devoted to him. When Hekiro falls terminally ill with tuberculosis and is hospitalised, with his sister being the only regular visitor, he finally regrets his behaviour. After Hekiro's death, Gen is taken back home with anemia by the hospital personnel, but once she awakes, she returns to her role as the housekeeper without questioning.

Cast
 Keiko Kishi as Gen
 Hiroshi Kawaguchi as Hekiro
 Kinuyo Tanaka as Mother
 Masayuki Mori as Father
 Kyōko Kishida as Mrs. Tanuma
 Noboru Nakaya as Patrolman Rokoru Shimizu
 Kyōko Enami as Nurse Miyata
 Jun Hamamura as Doctor
 Hikaru Hoshi as Owner of hiring horse
 Juzo Itami as Son of Factory owner
 Noriko Hodaka as Nurse

Background
In order to achieve a desaturated look, the film made use of a cinematographic technique known as bleach bypass. Ichikawa had been inspired by the photography for John Huston's 1956 adaptation of Moby-Dick.

Reception 
The Japanese filmmaker Akira Kurosawa cited Her Brother as one of his 100 favorite films.

References

External links
 

1960 films
1960 drama films
Best Film Kinema Junpo Award winners
Films directed by Kon Ichikawa
Films about siblings
Films about infectious diseases
Japanese drama films
Films based on Japanese novels
Daiei Film films
Films produced by Masaichi Nagata
Films scored by Yasushi Akutagawa
Films set in the Taishō period
1960s Japanese films